The Journal of Investigative Medicine, also abbreviated JIM, is a peer-reviewed medical journal covering all aspects of biomedicine. It was established in 1995 and is published eight times per year by BMJ Publishing Group on behalf of the American Federation for Medical Research, of which it is the official journal. The editor-in-chief is Michael J. McPhaul (Quest Diagnostics Nichols Institute). According to the Journal Citation Reports, the journal has a 2017 impact factor of 2.029.

References

External links

General medical journals
BMJ Group academic journals
Publications established in 1995
English-language journals
Academic journals associated with learned and professional societies of the United States
8 times per year journals